Swedish American Museum is a museum of Swedish American topics and the Swedish emigration to the United States, located in the Andersonville neighborhood of Chicago.

The Swedish American Museum in Chicago was founded by Kurt Mathisson in 1976. It moved to its current location on 5211 North Clark Street in 1987. King Carl XVI Gustaf of Sweden was present at the museum's founding and at its move to its new home. It is a core member of the Chicago Cultural Alliance, a consortium of 25 ethnic museums and cultural centers in Chicago.

The iconic water tower above the museum was removed on March 20, 2014, after being damaged during the harsh winter.

See also
 National Nordic Museum

References

External links
Swedish American Museum Official Website
Andersonville’s Swedish American Museum
Kurt Mathiasson
Article about the museum in Nordstjernan
Article about Swedish places around Chicago in Swedish Press

Museums in Chicago
Museums established in 1976
Ethnic museums in Illinois
History museums in Illinois
Organizations based in Chicago
Swedish-American culture in Chicago
Swedish-American museums
1976 establishments in Illinois
Cultural centers in Chicago